Janett Arceo Maldonado (born 30 September 1948), known as Janet Arceo, is a Mexican actress, TV presenter, announcer, director and businesswoman.

Filmography

References

External links

1948 births
Living people
Chespirito actors
Mexican child actresses
Mexican television actresses
Mexican film actresses
Mexican stage actresses
Mexican television presenters
Mexican radio presenters
Mexican women radio presenters
Actresses from Mexico City
20th-century Mexican actresses
21st-century Mexican actresses
Businesspeople from Mexico City
Mexican women television presenters